Jane M. Earll (born August 10, 1958) is a former Republican member of the Pennsylvania State Senate who represented the 49th District from 1997 to 2013.

Early career and personal life
Earll served as Assistant District Attorney for Erie County, Pennsylvania and as an attorney for Richards and Associates. She is married to Erie County District Attorney Jack Daneri.

Pennsylvania Senate
While in the Senate, Earll served as Chair of the Community, Economic & Recreational Committee, Vice Chair of the Finance Committee, and a member of the  Banking & Insurance, Judiciary, Rules & Executive Nominations, and Transportation Committees.

In 2002, she was named to the PoliticsPA list of Best Dressed Legislators.

Election Campaigns
Earll won election to the Senate against Democrat Buzz Andrezewski a year after losing a countywide race for District Attorney, and in re-election bids she faced down Democrats John Paul Jones, Tony Logue, and Cindy Purvis.

She was the Republican party's nominee for Lieutenant Governor on a ticket with Mike Fisher in 2002. The Pennsylvania Report described her as "an outstanding candidate for Lieutenant Governor" and said that she was "[w]ell-liked and respected on both sides of the aisle." She and Fisher lost the election to Ed Rendell and Catherine Baker Knoll.

References

External links

1958 births
Living people
Republican Party Pennsylvania state senators
Women state legislators in Pennsylvania
Allegheny College alumni
Claude W. Pettit College of Law alumni
21st-century American women